The Portezuelo Formation is a geologic formation of Late Cretaceous (Late Turonian to Early Coniacian) age, outcropping in the Mendoza, Río Negro and Neuquén provinces of Argentina. It is the fourth-oldest formation in the Neuquén Group and the older of the two formations in the Río Neuquén Subgroup. Formerly, that subgroup was treated as a formation, and the Portezuelo Formation was known as the Portezuelo Member.

Description 
The type locality of the Portezuelo Formation is the mountain range known as Sierra del Portezuelo in Neuquén Province. This formation conformably overlies the Lisandro Formation of the Río Limay Subgroup. In the top layers it grades into the Plottier Formation, the younger formation within the Río Neuquén Subgroup.

Sandstones and siltstones, probably deposited under fluvial conditions, make up the Portezuelo Formation. There are also occasional cemented claystone deposits, as well as numerous paleosols (fossil soils).

Fossil content 

Many dinosaur fossils have recently been described from this formation, as well as remains of several other types of animals:
 teleosteid fish including Leufuichthys
 abundant and diverse turtles including Portezueloemys and a species of Prochelidella
 titanosaurian sauropods including Futalognkosaurus, Baalsaurus, Malarguesaurus
 dromaeosaurid theropods (Neuquenraptor, Unenlagia, Pamparaptor)
 megaraptorid theropods (Megaraptor and an unnamed form)
 an alvarezsaurid theropod (Patagonykus)
abelisauroid theropods (a possible noasaurid and Elemgasem, an abelisaurid)
 several other theropods, including a modern, possibly galliform bird
 ornithopods including possible iguanodonts
 a possible azdarchoid pterosaur Argentinadraco

See also 
 List of fossil sites
 List of dinosaur bearing rock formations

References

Bibliography 
 
 

 
 
 

 
Geologic formations of Argentina
Cretaceous Argentina
Sandstone formations
Conglomerate formations
Limestone formations
Fluvial deposits
Cretaceous paleontological sites of South America
Paleontology in Argentina